Ebenezer Theophilus Odartei Ayeh is a Ghanaian politician and was a member of the first parliament of the second Republic of Ghana. He represented  Nsawam-Aburi  constituency under the membership of the Progress Party.

Early life and education 
Ebenezer was born on 18 December 1920 in the Eastern region of Ghana. He attended  Achimota School formerly Prince of Wales College and School, Achimota, currently known as Achimota College, with the nickname "Motown". He then moved to Accra to advance his education at the University of Ghana , Legon where he obtained his bachelor's degree in law. He worked as a Barrister and Solicitor before going into parliament.

Politics 
Ebenezer began his political career in 1969 when he became the parliamentary candidate for the Progress Party (PP)  to represent   Nsawam-Aburi constituency prior to the commencement of the 1969 Ghanaian parliamentary election. He assumed office as a member of the first parliament of the second Republic of Ghana on 1 October 1969 after being pronounced winner at the 1969 Ghanaian parliamentary election. His tenure ended on 13 January 1972.

Personal life 
He is a Christian.

References 

1920 births
Ghanaian MPs 1969–1972
People from Eastern Region (Ghana)
Alumni of Achimota School
University of Ghana alumni
Possibly living people